D-arginase is an enzyme with systematic name D-arginine amidinohydrolase. This enzyme catalyses the following chemical reaction

 D-arginine + H2O  D-ornithine + urea

See also 
 Arginase

References

External links 
 

EC 3.5.3